Maple Jam Music Group was an artist management/publicity group started by Greg Ladanyi, Starr Andreeff and Mike Renault in 2007 and based in Los Angeles.  The group is notable for Renault's management of Hollywood Undead and Type O Negative and Ladanyi's producing of Anna Vissi. It is now called "Maple Jam Management Group".

References

External links
 Official Website
 Maple Jam Music Group- Discography on Discogs

Talent agencies